The Michigan–Ohio State women's basketball rivalry is a college basketball rivalry between the Michigan Wolverines and Ohio State Buckeyes women's basketball programs that is part of the larger rivalry between the University of Michigan and Ohio State University. The rivalry between the Wolverines and Buckeyes notably includes football and men's basketball.

Series history
As of January 2022, Ohio State leads the series 57–16, including winning 30 of the first 32 meetings between the two teams. With both teams being in the Big Ten Conference, the teams have met at least once a year since 1978. In January 2011, Michigan completed its first season sweep of Ohio State. 

From 2010 to 2021, only two of the last 20 games between Michigan and Ohio State have had a margin larger than 11 points. While the last twelve games between the rivals have each been decided by single digits. Michigan has seven wins over Ohio State since Kim Barnes Arico took over as head coach in 2012–13, accounting for 44 percent of Michigan's 16 all-time wins against the Buckeyes. 

On January 7, 2012, Michigan upset No. 8 Ohio State 73–62. This marked the Wolverines first win over Ohio State when the Buckeyes were ranked in the Top-10. This also marked the Wolverines third consecutive win over the Buckeyes, who were ranked each time, their longest win streak during the rivalry. 

On January 7, 2018, for the first time in the series' history dating back to 1978, the teams met while both were ranked in the Top-25. The Buckeyes were ranked No. 10 in both the AP Poll and the Coaches Poll, while the Wolverines were ranked No. 22 in the AP Poll and No. 20 in the Coaches Poll. Ohio State won the game 78–71 in overtime. On January 16, 2018, the teams again met while both were ranked in the Top-25. The Buckeyes (16–2, 5–0 Big Ten) were ranked No. 8 in both the AP Poll and Coaches Poll, while the Wolverines (15–4, 4–2 Big Ten) were ranked No. 19 in the AP Poll and No. 18 in the Coaches Poll. Michigan upset Ohio State 84–75. 

On February 21, 2021, the teams met while both were ranked in the Top-25. The Wolverines (13–2, 8–2 Big Ten) were ranked No. 11 in both the AP Poll and Coaches Poll, while the Buckeyes (13–4, 9–4 Big Ten) were ranked No. 15 in the AP Poll and No. 14 in the Coaches Poll. Michigan won the game 75–66.

On December 31, 2021, the teams met while both were ranked in the Top-25. The Wolverines (11–1, 2–0 Big Ten) were ranked No. 9 in the AP Poll and No. 7 in the Coaches Poll, while the Buckeyes (9–2, 1–1 Big Ten) were ranked No. 25 in both the AP Poll and Coaches Poll. Michigan won the game 90–71. This was Michigan's largest margin of victory over Ohio State in the history of the rivalry.

On January 27, 2022, the teams met while both were ranked in the Top-25. The Wolverines (17–2, 8–1 Big Ten) were ranked No. 7 in both the AP Poll and Coaches Poll, while the Buckeyes (15–3, 7–2 Big Ten) were ranked No. 22 in the AP Poll, and No. 19 Coaches Poll. Michigan won the game 77–58. This matched Michigan's largest margin of victory over Ohio State in the history of the rivalry. The win marked Michigan's first season sweep over Ohio State since the 2010–11 season.

Rival accomplishments
The following summarizes the accomplishments of the two programs.

Game results

References

College basketball rivalries in the United States
Big Ten Conference rivalries
Michigan Wolverines women's basketball
Ohio State Buckeyes women's basketball